An asteroid body is a microscopic finding seen within the giant cells of granulomas in diseases such as sarcoidosis and foreign-body giant cell reactions.

There is controversy about their composition. Traditionally, they were thought to be cytoskeletal elements and to consist primarily of vimentin.  However, more recent research suggested that that was incorrect and that they may be composed of lipids arranged into bilayer membranes.

They were also once thought to be related to centrioles, an organelle involved in cell division in eukaryotes.

See also
Asteroid
Centriole
Schaumann body
Granulomatous diseases
Sarcoidosis

Additional images

References

Histopathology